The 2022–23 South African Premier Division from 5 August 2022 to 20 May 2023 is the 27th consecutive season of the PSL. Mamelodi Sundowns are the 5-time defending champions, having won the title from the 2017–18 season to 2021–22. Sekhukhune United relocated from Ellis Park Stadium to Peter Mokaba Stadium.

Teams

Team changes 
The following teams changed divisions since the end of the 2021-22 season

Promoted from the 2021–22 National First Division

•Richards Bay F.C.

Relegated from the 2021–22 South African Premier Division

•Baroka F.C.

Location of teams

Stadiums and locations

Number of teams by province

League table

Results

Statistics

Top scorers

Hat-tricks

Most assists

Clean sheets

See also 

 2022 MTN 8
 2022-23 Nedbank Cup
 2022-23 National First Division
 2022-23 SAFA Women's League

References

External links 
 Official website

South Africa
Premier Division
Premier Soccer League seasons